Walter Kaminsky (born 7 May 1941) is a German chemist. His research dwells in olefin polymerization, and also in plastic recycling. He discovered the high activity of Group 4 metallocene/methylaluminoxane (MAO) mixtures as catalysts for olefin polymerization in 1980.

He was awarded, among other prizes, the Körber European Science Prize in 1988, the 1999 Benjamin Franklin Medal, and the Hermann Staudinger Prize 2002.

Kaminsky was born in Hamburg, Germany and studied Chemistry at the University of Hamburg. He joined their faculty in 1979, and is currently a full professor for Technical and Macromolecular Chemistry.

References

External links
 Homepage

20th-century German chemists
Scientists from Hamburg
1941 births
Living people
Academic staff of the University of Hamburg
21st-century German chemists